Aminata Savadogo (born 9 January 1993), occasionally known as simply Aminata, is a Latvian singer, songwriter, record producer, and model.
She represented Latvia in the Eurovision Song Contest 2015 with the song "Love Injected". She released her debut studio album, Inner Voice, in April 2015.

Life and career

1993–2014: Early life and career
Savadogo was born in Riga on 9 January 1993 to a mother of Latvian and Russian descent, and a Burkinabé father. She considers herself primarily Latvian.  She started singing at the age of 13 with private tutor Nadežda Buharova, graduated from the Bolderāja Music and Art School in Riga and secondary school with specialisation in flute. At age 15, she took part in the Latvian television show Krodziņā pie Paula and then also competed in Muzikālā banka at age 17. She also took part in Koru kari 3, the Latvian version of Clash of the Choirs as a part of the Golden Choir.

Savadogo achieved international attention when she competed in Dziesma 2014, the Latvian national selection for the Eurovision Song Contest 2014 with the song "I Can Breathe". She qualified from the first semi-final and then placed fifth in the final. Savadogo then won the Latvian television show Jaunā talantu fabrika.

2015–2016: Eurovision Song Contest 2015 and Inner Voice

In 2015, Savadogo returned to the Latvian Eurovision national selection and was announced as a competitor in Supernova 2015 with the song "Love Injected". She qualified through the televote in both the second heat and the semi-final. In the final held on 22 February 2015, she was announced as the winner and represented Latvia in the Eurovision Song Contest 2015. Savadogo released her début studio album Inner Voice on 8 April 2015.

Savadogo performed tenth in the second semi-final of the Eurovision Song Contest 2015, after Israel and before Azerbaijan. She qualified to the final after placing second with 155 points, becoming Latvia's first qualification in seven years. In the final, she performed nineteenth, after Poland and before Romania. She finished in sixth place out of twenty-seven, placing 2nd in the rankings of the national juries, and earning a total of 186 points and three sets of the maximum twelve points a country can award. With her placing,  she earned Latvia their best placing since 2005 and their fourth best placing ever. She wrote the song "Heartbeat", performed by Justs who represented Latvia in the Eurovision Song Contest 2016.

2016–present: Red Moon and Golos
On 28 February 2016, Savadogo performed her new song "Fighter" during the final of Supernova 2016. The single's music video was later released on 13 April.

She later revealed her second studio album, titled Red Moon, would be released in October 2016. She competed on the fifth season of Golos, the Russian version of The Voice, but was eliminated in the knockout round. During her blind audition, she joined Polina Gagarina's team, who also competed in the Eurovision Song Contest 2015.

Savadogo wrote the song "I'm Like a Wolf", for Lithuanian singer Aistė Pilvelytė, who competed to represent Lithuania in the Eurovision Song Contest 2017 but lost to Fusedmarc and came second. In 2020, she wrote the song "Still Breathing" alongside Samanta Tīna, who performed the song. The song was selected to represent Latvia in the Eurovision Song Contest 2020, which was cancelled due to the COVID-19 pandemic. Samanta Tīna was instead internally select to represent Latvia in the Eurovision Song Contest 2021, and her song, "The Moon Is Rising", was also co-written by Aminata.

Discography

Albums

EP

Singles

References

Living people
1993 births
21st-century Latvian women singers
Latvian pop singers
Latvian songwriters
Latvian people of Burkinabé descent
Latvian people of Russian descent
Models from Riga
Eurovision Song Contest entrants for Latvia
Eurovision Song Contest entrants of 2015
English-language singers from Latvia
Latvian record producers
Latvian female models
Women in electronic music
The Voice (franchise) contestants
Women record producers
Musicians from Riga